Gibrilla Pato Bangura (born May 10, 1985) is a sprinter from Sierra Leone.

External links
 

1985 births
Living people
Sierra Leonean male sprinters
Athletes (track and field) at the 2002 Commonwealth Games
Athletes (track and field) at the 2006 Commonwealth Games
Athletes (track and field) at the 2014 Commonwealth Games
Commonwealth Games competitors for Sierra Leone
Place of birth missing (living people)
21st-century Sierra Leonean people